Dragan Milovanović (born 1953) was a Serbian politician in 1990s. He served in the National Assembly of Serbia from 1997 to 2001 and was the mayor of Podujevo for a time. For most of his political career, Milovanović was a member of the far-right Serbian Radical Party (Srpska radikalna stranka, SRS).

Early life and career
Milovanović was born in Podujevo, in what was then the Autonomous Region of Kosovo and Metohija in the People's Republic of Serbia, Federal People's Republic of Yugoslavia. He graduated with a bachelor of laws degree.

Politician

Early candidacies at the federal and republican levels
During the 1990s, Serbian and Yugoslavian politics were dominated by the authoritarian role of Socialist Party of Serbia (Socijalistička partija Srbije, SPS) leader Slobodan Milošević. In Kosovo, most members of the Albanian community boycotted Serbian political institutions throughout the decade. 

Milovanović ran for the national assembly in the 1990 Serbian parliamentary election as an independent candidate in the Podujevo division. He was defeated by Zoran Paunović of the SPS, the only other candidate on the ballot. The Serbian Radical Party was founded in 1991, and Milovanović became a member.

The first elections for the Federal Republic of Yugoslavia's Chamber of Citizens were held in May 1992 under a system of mixed proportional representation. Milovanović appeared in the thirty-second position on the SRS's electoral list and did not receive a mandate when the list won twenty-three seats. The Serbian and Yugoslavian electoral systems were both reformed after this vote, such that future assembly elections were held under full proportional representation.

Milovanović appeared on the SRS's lists for the Leskovac division in the 1992 and 1993 Serbian parliamentary elections, respectively in the ninth and tenth positions. The party won eight seats for the division in 1992 and three in 1993, and he did not receive a mandate on either occasion. (From 1992 to 2000, Serbia's electoral law stipulated that one-third of parliamentary mandates would be assigned to candidates on successful lists in numerical order, while the remaining two-thirds would be distributed amongst other candidates at the discretion of sponsoring parties or coalitions. Milovanović could have been awarded a mandate on either occasion despite his list position, but he was not.)

Milovanović appeared in the lead position on the SRS's list for the Kosovska Mitrovica division in the 1996 Yugoslavian parliamentary election and would have been automatically elected had the list won any mandates. It did not; the Socialists won all three seats in the division.

Mayor of Podujevo
Milovanović's campaign literature from the 1996 Yugoslavian election indicates that he served as mayor of Podujevo for two mandates; this presumably means that he became mayor following the May 1992 and December 1992 Serbian local elections. The same source indicates that the SPS overturned the Radical Party's local administration during his second term.

Parliamentarian
Milovanović was given the third position on the Radical Party's list for Priština in the 1997 Serbian parliamentary election and received a mandate after the list won four seats. The SRS joined a coalition government led by the Socialist Party of Serbia after the election, and Milovanović served as a supporter of the administration. In late 1998, he was appointed as the Radical Party's acting chair for Kosovo.

Serbia lost effective control over most of Kosovo, including Podujevo, following the Kosovo War and the 1999 NATO bombing of Yugoslavia. 

Vojislav Koštunica of the Democratic Opposition of Serbia (Demokratska opozicija Srbije, DOS) defeated Slobodan Milošević in the 2000 Yugoslavian presidential election, a watershed moment in Serbian and Yugoslavian politics. Serbia's government fell in October 2000, and Milovanović served as an opposition member at the conclusion of his term. A new Serbian parliamentary election was held in December 2000; prior to the vote, Serbia's electoral laws were reformed such that the entire country became a single electoral division and all mandates were awarded to candidates on successful lists at the discretion of the sponsoring parties or coalitions, irrespective of numerical order. Milanović was given the twenty-ninth position on the Radical Party's list. The list won twenty-three seats, and he did not receive a mandate for a second term.

Online sources do not indicate Milovanović's activities after 2000.

Electoral record

National Assembly of Serbia

References

1953 births
Living people
Politicians from Podujevo
Kosovo Serbs
Mayors of places in Serbia
Members of the National Assembly (Serbia)
Serbian Radical Party politicians